Kazıklı is a village in the Şahinbey District, Gaziantep Province, Turkey. The village is inhabited by Turkmens and had a population of 460 in 2022. The inhabitants are Alevis and belong to the Hacım Sultan and Baba Kaygusuz ocaks.

References

Villages in Şahinbey District